Pert is a surname. Notable people with the surname include:

 Brian Pert (born 1936), Australian rules footballer
 Candace Pert (1946–2013), American neuroscientist and pharmacologist 
 Claude Ernest Pert (1898–1982), British Indian Army major general and British India polo champion
 Gary Pert (born 1965), Australian rules footballer
 Geoffrey James Pert - see List of Fellows of the Royal Society elected in 1995
 Morris Pert (1947–2010), Scottish composer
 Nicholas Pert (born 1981), English chess player
 Sid Pert (1890–1966), a pioneer Australian rugby league footballer who played in the 1900s and 1910s
 Sid Pert, Jr. (born 1933), Australian rugby league footballer, son of the above
 Thomas Spert (died 1541), sometimes spelled Pert, English vice admiral in service to King Henry VIII

See also
 Pert (disambiguation)
 Rochelle Perts (born 1992), Dutch singer, winner of the talent show X Factor in 2011
 Peart
 Pertz